Kiasma is a contemporary art museum located on Mannerheimintie in Helsinki, Finland. Its name kiasma, Finnish for chiasma, alludes to the basic conceptual idea of its architect, Steven Holl. Kiasma is part of the Finnish National Gallery, and it is responsible for the gallery's contemporary art collection. Its central goal is to showcase contemporary art and to strengthen its status.

History

The contemporary art collection began as the Museum of Contemporary Art in 1990. In its earliest stages, the collection was housed in Ateneum.

An architectural design competition to design a building for the contemporary arts museum was held in 1992. The competition was open to architects from the Nordic and Baltic countries, in addition to which four architects or studios from elsewhere were invited to participate, though they were obliged to submit their proposals anonymously: Steven Holl from the US, Alvaro Siza from Portugal, Coop Himmelblau from Austria, and Kazuo Shinohara from Japan. The competition results were announced in 1993, and the winning proposal, titled Chiasma by Steven Holl, was selected from the 516 submitted entries. The design of the building, Finnishized as "Kiasma", underwent slight modification during the design process, but nevertheless was regarded as controversial; for instance its close proximity to the equestrian statue of Finnish President Carl Gustaf Emil Mannerheim. Construction work began in 1996, and the museum opened in May 1998.

The museum attracted 160,000–180,000 visitors per year in 2011–2013.

Kiasma was closed for repairs in September 2014 and reopened in March 2015. In 2016, Kiasma attracted over 310,000 visitors.

Collections 
The collections include works by around 8,000 artists, including
Reetta Ahonen,  Martti Aiha, Jan van Andersson Aken, Anders Gustaf, Antonio Rotta, Bernard Baron, Stig Baumgartner, Cornelis Bega, Erik Snedsbøl, Nicolas Berchem, Honoré Daumier, Karel Dujardin,  and Risto Laakkonen.

Gallery

See also
 Finnish National Gallery
 Ateneum
 Sinebrychoff Art Museum
 EMMA – Espoo Museum of Modern Art
 List of national galleries

References

Further reading
 Nancy Marmer, "Holl's Kiasma Debuts in Helsinki," Art in America, October 1998, p. 35.

External links
 

Infrastructure completed in 1998
Contemporary art galleries in Finland
Museums in Helsinki
Modern art museums
Steven Holl buildings
Art museums and galleries in Finland
1998 establishments in Finland
Art museums established in 1998
Kluuvi